IM L7 is a full-size luxury electric sedan to be produced by Chinese automobile manufacturer IM Motors, also known as Zhiji Motors, a joint venture between SAIC Motor, Pudong New Area and Alibaba. Production started in early 2022.

Overview

The IM L7 was revealed as a prototype on 19 April 2021, at Auto Shanghai, alongside the IM LS7 concept SUV and Airo concept car. On the same day, the car went on pre-sale. The L7 is intended to be a competitor of the shorter Tesla Model S in the Chinese car market, with its IM AD autonomous driving system, and will go on sale in Q1 2022.

Specifications
The IM L7 uses the company's IM AD intelligent driving system, which uses Nvidia's Jetson Xavier chipset, LIDAR, 12 cameras, 5 millimeter wave radars, and 12 ultrasonic sensors. This enables the car to be driven autonomously on freeways and semi-autonomously on city streets, as well be summoned by the driver and parked by itself.

The IM L7 uses wireless charging.

The chassis used for the IM L7 was developed with input of British engineering consultant Williams Advanced Engineering, which features four wheel steering and a CDC electronic-controlled damping system.

Interior
The interior features both a  dashboard touchscreen and a  center touchscreen, as well touchpads on the steering wheel. The car is equipped with a 22-speaker sound system with a total output of 1120 watts.

References

SAIC Motor vehicles
L7
2020s cars
Cars introduced in 2021
Cars of China
Production electric cars